Sebbe Augustijns (born 3 September 1999) is a Belgian professional footballer who plays as a midfielder for Eredivisie club RKC Waalwijk.

Club career
Born in Kalmthout, Augustijns played youth football for Achterbroek, Willem II, Beerschot and Waasland-Beveren before playing for KV Mechelen between 2014 and 2019. He left KV Mechelen in summer 2019 and subsequently signed for RKC Waalwijk. He made his debut for Waalwijk on 28 October 2020, starting in a 2–2 KNVB Cup draw with SC Cambuur before being substituted with 15 minutes remaining. He made his Eredivisie debut for Waalwijk as a substitute in a 1–1 draw away to sc Heerenveen on 14 January 2021.

References

External links
 
 Career stats & Profile - Voetbal International

1999 births
Living people
Belgian footballers
People from Kalmthout
Footballers from Antwerp Province
Association football midfielders
Willem II (football club) players
K Beerschot VA players
S.K. Beveren players
K.V. Mechelen players
RKC Waalwijk players
Eredivisie players